WBGT may refer to:

 Wet-bulb globe temperature
 WBGT-CD, a class-A digital TV station (channel 29, virtual 46) licensed to Rochester, New York, United States